The 2013 ISU World Team Trophy was an international team figure skating competition in the 2012–13 season. Participating countries selected two men's single skaters, two ladies' single skaters, one pair and one ice dancing entry to compete in a team format with points based on the skaters' placement.

Entries

Overview
Six countries qualified for the event: Canada (7824 points), the United States (7156), Japan (6823), Russia (6648), France (4826), and China (4702). Japan had no pair entry due to the split of Narumi Takahashi / Mervin Tran. There were several changes to the initial roster. Ekaterina Bobrova / Dmitri Soloviev withdrew due to an injury to Soloviev and Ksenia Monko / Kirill Khaliavin were named in their place. Nathalie Péchalat / Fabian Bourzat were replaced by Pernelle Carron / Lloyd Jones, Florent Amodio by Romain Ponsart, and Song Nan by Wang Yi.

Japan and the United States were tied with 47 points each after the first day of competition, with Russia in third. Madison Chock / Evan Bates, Patrick Chan, and Adelina Sotnikova were the leaders in the short dance, men's, and ladies' short programs, respectively. The second day featured the pair's short program, free dance, and men's free skating. Tatiana Volosozhar / Maxim Trankov took the lead in pairs, while Daisuke Takahashi and Chock / Bates won the men's and dance free programs respectively. Konstantin Menshov, third after the short program, withdrew after dislocating his right shoulder attempting a triple Axel in the free skating. The United States moved into the lead with 55 points, Canada rose to second place (50), and Japan slipped to third (48). 

The third and final day of competition features the pairs' and ladies' free skating.

Results

Team standings

Men

Ladies

Pairs

Ice dancing

Prize money

References

External links
 Entries
 Starting order and results

Isu World Team Trophy In Figure Skating, 2013
ISU World Team Trophy in Figure Skating